Ole Kristian Langås (born 7 May 1993) is a Norwegian footballer who plays as a striker for Ull/Kisa.

Club career
Langås was born in Bærum, but did not grow up there. He started his football career in Hvam IL, joining neighbors Raumnes & Årnes in 2008. He played briefly for their senior team on the fifth tier. Ahead of the 2009 season he signed a contract with Rosenborg BK. He would finish lower secondary school in the spring of 2009 while being loaned back to Raumnes & Årnes. He made his debut for Rosenborg's first team in a 2011 pre-season friendly. However, he never played a competitive match and was released in August 2012. He could not secure a contract with neighbours Ranheim, and trialled with Strømmen before signing for second-tier Ullensaker/Kisa.

He made his debut for Ull/Kisa in the 3–0 defeat against Start on 13 August 2012. He scored his first goal for the club in the 3–0 victory against Alta on 2 September 2012. Ahead of the 2014 season he moved up a tier, to Sandnes Ulf. He made his first-tier debut in April 2014 against Brann.

Ahead of the 2016 season he moved to his old team Ull/Kisa.

Career statistics

References

1993 births
Living people
People from Nes, Akershus
Sportspeople from Bærum
Norwegian footballers
Association football forwards
Ullensaker/Kisa IL players
Norwegian First Division players
Sandnes Ulf players
Eliteserien players